Felton Grandison Clark (October 13, 1903 – July 5, 1970) was an African-American academic administrator from Louisiana. He served as the president of Southern University (SU), a historically black university and land-grant college in Baton Rouge, Louisiana, from 1938 to 1969. During this period, he led decades of expansion that resulted in the number of students increasing from 1,500 to over 11,000. By the time of his retirement, SU had grown to be America's largest historically black university by enrollment.

Early life
Clark was born on October 13, 1903, in Baton Rouge, Louisiana. His father, Joseph Samuel Clark, was the president of Southern University (SU) from 1914 to 1938.

Clark graduated from Beloit College, where he earned a bachelor's degree in 1922. He did graduate work at Columbia University, where he earned a master's degree in 1925 and a PhD in 1933.

Career
Clark was a professor at Wiley College from 1925 to 1927, SU from 1927 to 1930, and Howard University from 1931 to 1934. He worked for the United States Office of Education in 1936–1937.

Clark was appointed as a dean at SU in 1934. He served as its president from 1938 to 1969, overseeing large-scale development of curriculum, buildings on campus and graduate programs.

From 1960, numerous students at the university began to press for change and many were active in the civil rights movement. The university was disrupted by the Baton Rouge sit-ins of 1960.

By the time of Clark's retirement in 1969, SU had more than 11,000 students and it had become the largest historically black university in the United States by enrollment.

Other activities
Clark served on the editorial board of the Journal of Negro Education. He also served as vice president of the national council of the YMCA. He was elected into the Phi Beta Kappa honor society. He attended the 1964 World Alliance Commission on Race Relationships conference in Geneva, Switzerland as a delegate.

Personal life and legacy

Clark married Allene Knighten in 1958. They had no children. He was a Baptist, and a 33rd degree Mason.

Clark died on July 5, 1970, in New Orleans, Louisiana, at 66. In 1946 Clark was awarded an honorary legum doctor from Beloit College.

Other honors followed his death: he is the namesake of the multi-purpose, 7,500-seat F. G. Clark Center in Baton Rouge, which opened in 1975. Felton Grandison Clark Hall, informally called Grandison Hall, is a dormitory on the SU campus that was renovated in 1991 and named for him.

References

Further reading
Eubanks, Bicknell: "Unrest Subsides At Negro College: Scores Withdraw," The Christian Science Monitor, April 5, 1960,  p. 1
Clark, Felton G.: Dictionary of American Biography, Supplement 8  (London: Collier Macmillan Publishers, 1988).
Warren, Robert Penn. Interview with Felton Grandison Clark, February 5, 1964 published in Who Speaks for the Negro? searchable transcript at Who Speaks for the Negro? Digital Archive of the Robert Penn Warren Center for the Humanities and the Jean and Alexander Heard Libraries at Vanderbilt University based on collections at University of Kentucky and Yale University Libraries.

1903 births
1970 deaths
People from Baton Rouge, Louisiana
Beloit College alumni
Columbia University alumni
Wiley College faculty
Southern University faculty
Howard University faculty
Southern University presidents
African-American academics
American Freemasons
Baptists from Louisiana
YMCA leaders
20th-century Baptists
20th-century African-American people
20th-century American academics